Jean-Michel Badiane (born 9 May 1983, in Paris) is a French football defender of Senegalese descent, last playing for Ligue 2 side CS Sedan Ardennes.

Career 
A Paris Saint-Germain player until the summer of 2006, Badiane was the third choice centre back for the Parisian side, and made his professional début on 21 August 2004 in a match against Nantes. He signed his first professional contract with the club in 2004, having been with PSG since the age of 10 in the youth teams.

Badiane has represented France at under-15, under-17 and has been in the under-21 squad.

Badiane had trials with English Championship side Stoke City in the summer of 2007, seemingly to replace the outgoing captain Danny Higginbotham.

On 15 April 2009 the defender and CS Sedan Ardennes officials mutually agreed to terminate the player's contract, this season, Badiane has never been able to play due to recurrent knee injuries.

References

External links
 

1983 births
Living people
French footballers
Footballers from Paris
Paris Saint-Germain F.C. players
CS Sedan Ardennes players
Paris FC players
Ligue 1 players
Ligue 2 players
Championnat National players
France under-21 international footballers
France youth international footballers
French sportspeople of Senegalese descent
Association football defenders